The 1964 United Kingdom general election in Northern Ireland was held on 15 October with 12 MPs elected in single-seat constituencies using first-past-the-post as part of the wider general election in the United Kingdom.

Results
The Ulster Unionists won all the seats in region, as they had at the previous election.

In the election as a whole, the Conservative Party, which included the Ulster Unionists, led by Sir Alec Douglas-Home, lost their majority, lost power after thirteen years in government. The Labour Party won a narrow majority and Harold Wilson was appointed as Prime Minister.

MPs elected

Footnotes

References

Northern Ireland
1964
1964 elections in Northern Ireland